is a Japanese politician of the Democratic Party of Japan, a member of the House of Representatives in the Diet (national legislature). A native of Iwamizawa, Hokkaidō and graduate of Keio University, he was elected for the first time in 1990. Prior to going into politics, he ran a ranch.

In the first cabinet reshuffle of Prime Minister Yoshihiko Noda on October 1, 2012, he was appointed Chairman of the National Public Safety Commission, Minister of State for Consumer Affairs and Food Safety, taking over from Jin Matsubara.

References

External links 
  in Japanese.

1942 births
Living people
Democratic Party of Japan politicians
Keio University alumni
Members of the House of Representatives (Japan)
Politicians from Hokkaido
Ranchers
Toyota Tsusho
21st-century Japanese politicians
People from Iwamizawa, Hokkaido